The Hessian is a 1972 novel by Howard Fast set in the time of the American Revolution.

Plot
The book begins with an incident in 1781 when a small detachment of  Hessian (German auxiliaries in the British service) soldiers encounter a mentally retarded man, Saul Clamberham, on a Connecticut hill-side. Clamberham follows the Jägers out of confused curiosity, making meaningless markings on a slate. Misunderstanding the situation, an exasperated Hessian officer, with little English, becomes convinced that Clamberham is a spy and has the autistic villager hanged from a tree. Outraged, the local population ambush the Hessians and kill all but a drummer boy who escapes. The narrator of the story: the town physician and a Continental Army veteran, subsequently discovers that the young drummer Hans Pohl is being sheltered in a Quaker family's barn while township authorities hunt for him. Captured, the Hessian boy is tried for murder. Although his role in the earlier death was limited to beating his drum as the hanging took place, Pohl fatally admits that he would have carried out his duty as a soldier and participated directly in the execution if so ordered. The doctor, himself a victim of prejudice as an English-born Catholic in a small Puritan community, watches helplessly while the German boy is hanged.

Theme
The theme throughout the novel is one of futility, as two innocents are pointlessly killed by men who see themselves as having no choice in what they do.

External links
 The Hessian at GoodReads.com

1972 American novels
Historical novels
Novels by Howard Fast
Novels set during the American Revolutionary War